

Major events
January 26 (January 15 in the Julian calendar), 1714 — Nizhny Novgorod Governorate was formed on the lands in the north-west of Kazan Governorate.

Subdivisions (as of 1716)
Archangelgorod Governorate (Архангелогородская губерния)
Subdivided into 18.5 lots.
Azov Governorate (Азовская губерния)
Subdivided into 7.5 lots.
Kazan Governorate (Казанская губерния)
Subdivided into lots.
Kiev Governorate (Киевская губерния)
Subdivided into 5 lots.
Moscow Governorate (Московская губерния)
Subdivided into lots.
Nizhny Novgorod Governorate (Нижегородская губерния)
Subdivided into lots.
Riga Governorate (Рижская губерния)
Subdivided into lots.
St. Petersburg Governorate (Санкт-Петербургская губерния)
Subdivided into 32.2 lots.
Siberian Governorate (Сибирская губерния)
Subdivided into 9 lots.

1714-1717
1710s in Russia